Alistair Fernando Vermaak (born 28 April 1989) is a South African professional rugby union player for the  in Super Rugby and  in the Currie Cup and in the Rugby Challenge. His regular position is prop.

Career

Youth

In 2008, Vermaak moved to Cape Town to join Western Province. He played for them in the 2008 Under-19 Provincial Championship and 2010 Under-21 Provincial Championship competitions.

Western Province / Stormers
He made five appearances in total in the competition. One more appearance followed in the 2012 Vodacom Cup competition.

Boland Cavaliers
Vermaak had a short loan spell at the  during the 2013 Vodacom Cup competition, making three appearances in total.

Varsity Cup

References

South African rugby union players
Living people
1989 births
Rugby union players from Port Elizabeth
Boland Cavaliers players
Western Province (rugby union) players
Stormers players
Rugby union props